Matthew Ben Mulligan (born January 18, 1985) is a former American football tight end. He played college football at The University of Maine. Mulligan was signed by the Miami Dolphins as an undrafted free agent in 2008. He has also been a member of the Tennessee Titans, New York Jets, St. Louis Rams, Green Bay Packers, New England Patriots, Chicago Bears, Arizona Cardinals, Buffalo Bills, and Detroit Lions. He currently serves as a volunteer strength and conditioning coach for the Black Bears.

Early years
Mulligan lived in Enfield, Maine and attended high school at Penobscot Valley High School in Howland, Maine. After high school, he enrolled at Husson University. Despite never playing the sport in high school, Mulligan joined Husson's football team as a tight end and thrived, transferring to the University of Maine the following season.

Professional career

Miami Dolphins
Mulligan was signed by the Miami Dolphins as an undrafted free agent in 2008. He was released from the Dolphins on August 30 during final cuts. However, the Dolphins re-signed him to the practice squad the following day. Mulligan remained on the practice squad until his release on November 5.

Tennessee Titans
Mulligan was signed to the practice squad of the Tennessee Titans on November 19, 2008. Following the season, he was re-signed to a future contract on January 12. The Titans waived him on September 4.

New York Jets
Mulligan was claimed off waivers by the New York Jets on September 6, 2009. He was waived on September 23. He was re-signed to the practice squad on September 24. He was promoted to the active roster on December 2.

St. Louis Rams
The St. Louis Rams signed Mulligan on March 26, 2012. After one season with the team, Mulligan was released on March 23, 2013.

Green Bay Packers
Mulligan was signed by the Green Bay Packers on April 9, 2013. On August 31, 2013, he was released by the Packers during final team cuts.

New England Patriots
On September 3, 2013, the New England Patriots signed Mulligan, but released him just two days later. The Patriots re-signed him on September 10. On September 29, 2013, he caught the last touchdown pass of Tom Brady's 52 straight games (two shy of the NFL record) with at least one passing touchdown.

Chicago Bears
On April 8, 2014, Mulligan was signed by the Chicago Bears to a one-year deal. On September 16, 2014, his contract was terminated by the Chicago Bears.

Arizona Cardinals
Mulligan signed with the Arizona Cardinals on November 18, 2014. He was released on December 5, 2014.

Tennessee Titans (second stint)
On December 16, 2014 Mulligan signed with the Tennessee Titans.

Buffalo Bills
On June 18, 2015, Mulligan signed with the Buffalo Bills. On December 8, 2015, Mulligan was released by the Bills after Nick O'Leary was promoted from the practice squad.

Detroit Lions
On April 4, 2016, Mulligan signed a one-year contract with the Detroit Lions. On August 29, 2016, Mulligan was released by the Lions. He was re-signed by the Lions on November 1, 2016.

References

External links
 Detroit Lions bio
 Tennessee Titans bio
 Chicago Bears bio
 New England Patriots bio
 Green Bay Packers bio
 New York Jets bio
 Maine Black Bears bio

1985 births
Living people
Players of American football from Maine
Sportspeople from Bangor, Maine
American football tight ends
Maine Black Bears football players
Miami Dolphins players
Tennessee Titans players
New York Jets players
St. Louis Rams players
Green Bay Packers players
New England Patriots players
Chicago Bears players
Arizona Cardinals players
Buffalo Bills players
Detroit Lions players
People from Penobscot County, Maine